Floating bur-reed is a common name for several plants and may refer to:

Sparganium angustifolium
Sparganium fluctuans, native to North America